is a Japanese politician serving in the House of Representatives in the Diet (national legislature) as a member of the Democratic Party of Japan. A native of Miyoshi District, Tokushima and graduate of Waseda University she was elected for the first time in 2003 after a run in 2000. She lost her seat in the 2005 general election, but she regained the seat in December after Goto Masanori's resignation.

According to her website as of 2020, she was most recently elected to the House of Councillors (Japan) of the Diet as a member of Constitutional Democratic Party of Japan (Minshuto).

References

External links 
  Official website in Japanese.

Members of the House of Representatives (Japan)
Female members of the House of Representatives (Japan)
Waseda University alumni
People from Tokushima Prefecture
Living people
1971 births
Democratic Party of Japan politicians
21st-century Japanese politicians
21st-century Japanese women politicians